Bye Creek is a  long 2nd order tributary to the Banister River in Halifax County, Virginia.  This is the only stream of this name in the United States.

Course 
Bye Creek rises in a spring about 0.25 miles southwest of Chaneys Store, Virginia in Pittsylvania County and then flows generally east into Halifax County to join the Banister River about 1.5 miles north-northwest of Meadville.

Watershed 
Bye Creek drains  of area, receives about 45.5 in/year of precipitation, has a wetness index of 374.04, and is about 55% forested.

See also 
 List of Virginia Rivers

References 

Rivers of Virginia
Rivers of Halifax County, Virginia
Rivers of Pittsylvania County, Virginia
Tributaries of the Roanoke River